Pirometer Plant is a company based in Saint Petersburg, Russia. It is part of the Concern Radio-Electronic Technologies holding (Rostec group).

The Pirometer Plant makes many types of electronic products with uses in a wide range of applications, including infrared electronics and electronic warning signaling equipment. It is part of the NPO Elektroavtomatika.

References

External links
 Official website

Electronics companies of Russia
Companies based in Saint Petersburg
Concern Radio-Electronic Technologies
Aircraft component manufacturers of the Soviet Union
Ministry of the Aviation Industry (Soviet Union)
Electronics companies of the Soviet Union